Dieter "Jogi" Lieberwirth (born 13 January 1954) is a German football coach and a former player. In the 2005–06 season, he was caretaker manager of 1. FC Nürnberg for one game.

Honours
 DFB-Pokal finalist: 1981–82

References

1954 births
Living people
German footballers
Bundesliga players
2. Bundesliga players
1. FC Nürnberg players
German football managers
1. FC Nürnberg managers
Association football midfielders
Sportspeople from Fürth
Footballers from Bavaria